The Antonov A-40 Krylya Tanka  (meaning "tank wings") was a Soviet attempt to allow a tank to glide onto a battlefield after being towed aloft by an airplane, to support airborne forces or partisans. A prototype was built and tested in 1942, but was found to be unworkable. This vehicle is sometimes called the A-40T or KT.

Design and development

Instead of loading light tanks onto gliders, as other nations had done, Soviet airborne forces had strapped T-27 tankettes underneath heavy bombers and landed them on airfields. In the 1930s, there were experimental efforts to parachute tanks or simply drop them into water. During the 1940 occupation of Bessarabia, light tanks may have been dropped from a few meters up by TB-3 bombers, which, as long as the gearbox was in neutral, would allow them to roll to a stop.

The biggest problem with air-dropping vehicles is if their crews are dropped separately, they may be delayed or prevented from bringing them into action. Gliders allow crews to arrive at the drop/landing zone along with their vehicles. They also minimize exposure of the valuable towing aircraft, which need not appear over the battlefield. So the Soviet Air Force ordered Oleg Antonov to design a glider for landing tanks.

Antonov was more ambitious. Instead of building a glider, he added a detachable cradle to a T-60 light tank bearing large wood and fabric biplane wings and a twin tail. Such a tank could glide into the battlefield, drop its wings, and be ready to fight within minutes.

One T-60 was converted into a glider in 1942, intended to be towed by a Petlyakov Pe-8 or a Tupolev TB-3. The tank was lightened for air use by removing its armament, ammunition and headlights, and leaving a very limited amount of fuel. Even with these modifications, the TB-3 bomber had to ditch the glider during its only flight, on September 2, 1942, to avoid crashing, due to the T-60's extreme drag (although the tank reportedly glided smoothly). The A-40 was piloted by the famous Soviet experimental glider pilot Sergei Anokhin. The T-60 landed in a field near the airport, and after dropping the glider wings and tail, the driver returned it to its base. Due to the lack of a sufficiently powerful aircraft to tow it at the required , the project was abandoned.

Specifications

See also 
 Winged tank
 Baynes Bat, a British design of World War II to add glider wings to a tank
 General Aircraft Hamilcar, a military glider of the period capable of carrying light tanks.
 Messerschmitt Me 321 and Junkers Ju 322, German gliders designed to be capable of carrying light armored vehicles.
 The T-80, the T-84 and the Mil Mi-24 have also been nicknamed Flying Tank, the first two for their great speed for a land vehicle, the latter for its great resilience for an airborne vehicle.
The attack plane Ilyushin Il-2 has also been nicknamed "the flying tank".

References

Citations

Bibliography

External links 

 T-60 modifications  at battlefield.ru
 Antonov KT flying tank at unrealaircraft.com
 KT-40 flying tank at the Russian Aviation Page 
 Krylja Tanka, illustrated page in Lithuanian
 Flying Tanks that Shed Their Wings by Lew Holt in Modern Mechanics and Inventions, July 1932.

A-40
1940s Soviet military transport aircraft
Glider aircraft
Biplanes
Twin-boom aircraft
Airborne fighting vehicles
Abandoned military aircraft projects of the Soviet Union
World War II tanks of the Soviet Union
History of the tank
Aircraft first flown in 1942